KFLK-LP (95.9 FM) is a radio station licensed to serve the community of Minot, North Dakota. The station is owned by Calvary Chapel Minot and airs a religious format.

The station was assigned the KFLK-LP call letters by the Federal Communications Commission on July 1, 2014.

References

External links
 Official Website
 

FLK-LP
Radio stations established in 2015
2015 establishments in North Dakota
Radio stations in Fargo, North Dakota
FLK-LP
Calvary Chapel Association